"Two Kinds of Teardrops" is a song by Del Shannon, which he released in 1963 as a single and on the album Little Town Flirt. The song spent 13 weeks on the UK's Record Retailer chart, peaking at No. 5, while spending nine weeks on the Billboard Hot 100 chart, peaking at No. 50, and reaching No. 6 in both Ireland and Hong Kong.

Chart performance

References

1963 songs
1963 singles
Del Shannon songs
Songs written by Del Shannon